The Concrete Society is a UK based non-profit company that was founded in 1966 in response to the increasing need for a single organisation embracing all those interested in concrete. On its formal inauguration, on 13 October 1966, the Society took over the work of the four organisations (the Reinforced Concrete Association, the Prestressed Concrete Development Group, the Pavings Development Group and the Formwork Development Group), by then in the process of dissolution, in order both to carry on their work and to extend it to cover the entire field of concrete technology and use.

Today The Concrete Society is an Independent Concrete Advisory company. Over the years the company has become a provider of information serving the needs of clients, architects, engineers, specifiers, suppliers, contractors and users of concrete.  The Society is an individual membership body, without trade affiliations, which exists to provide information to exchange information and experience and to promote concrete as a construction medium.

Membership 
The Concrete Society is an independent membership organisation bringing together all those with an interest in concrete. It allows members to exchange knowledge and experience across all disciplines.

Concrete Magazine 
As part of their services, the Concrete Society provides its members, and all interested parties, with its own publication. The Concrete targets the global concrete industry by bringing stories from across the UK/Ireland. Concrete Engineering International (CEI) covers projects around the world. The CEI is published every six months providing international features and articles covering the global concrete construction industry. The magazine is available in both: digital and print version and is available to all the members of the Society.

Trust 
The Concrete Society Trust was established in 1965.  Recently its main activity has been an annual awards competition for students studying a concrete related discipline, involving the assessment of research papers and theses.

Another Trust was incorporated in 1969, The Joe Peirce Trust. It was initially established to provide an annual prize for the best candidate for the Advanced Concrete Technology. The next step of the Trust was to award travelling bursaries for the students interested in attending national and international conferences related to their field of study.

Since the number of suitable candidates has fallen significantly in recent years, it was decided to merge both trusts into a single body with a combined portfolio of awards, which led to formation of The Concrete Society Trust. Both parties agreed to keep the original awards, but broaden the scope by allowing the applicants to be at any stage of their career opposed to making it solely available to university students.

Coat of Arms

The arms were officially granted on September 5, 1967.

The shield shows a union of four quarters, Or (gold/yellow) representing fine and coarse aggregate and Argent (silver/white) representing cement. The wavy fess suggests water and the Sable (black) pale, reinforcement. The Gules (red) annulet is for the association of the elements of the Society, and the lions a symbol of strength. The four quarters also symbolise the four bodies that came together in the Society.

In the crest the mural crown is an emblem of building and architecture and the circle issuing from it and the lion repeat the symbolism of the shield while the snowflake brings in a personal touch, representing Sir Frederick Snow's role in the formation of the society.

The motto 'Concreti Corroboramur' means 'Having come together, we are strengthened'.

References

External links 
Official website.

Concrete
Organizations established in 1966
Organisations based in Surrey
Construction in the United Kingdom
Camberley
Construction organizations